Films produced in Norway in the 1980s:

1980s

External links
 Norwegian film at the Internet Movie Database

1980s
Norwegian
Films